Dante's Inferno: Abandon All Hope is a 2010 black and white film produced and directed by Boris Acosta. The story is based on the first part of Dante Alighieri's Divine Comedy - Inferno.

Plot
This film is a narrative journey from Dante's own hand, through the worst of the afterlife, Inferno. It is a chronological descent to the deepest of Hell, circle by circle to the exit into Purgatory. It features most of Gustave Dore's lithograph illustrations and some excerpts of the 1911 feature film "L'Inferno".

Cast

References
An early version of this film was introduced as a work-in-progress at the Market of the Cannes Film Festival in 2008

External links
 
 

Films based on Inferno (Dante)
2010s Italian-language films
2010 horror films
2010 films
2010s American animated films
Fiction about purgatory
2010 directorial debut films
2010s English-language films